Down Tor is a tor on Dartmoor, England, at GR 581694, height , overlooking Burrator Reservoir.

References 

Tors of Dartmoor
Dartmoor